was the pen name of a Japanese novelist and poet, active during the Shōwa and Heisei periods of Japan.

Biography
Shimizu was born in Shibuya, Tokyo, and attended the Seisoku Eigo Gakko in Kanda. From 1938 to 1941, he travelled around the country, and met noted author Riichi Yokomitsu in 1940 under whom he studied fiction writing. His first work, Tsuru (“Crane”) published in 1941 caught the attention of noted poet Ishida Hakyo, who took him on as a student. In 1944, his novel Karitachi (“Wild Geese”) was awarded the prestigious Akutagawa Prize.

His output was prolific in the post-war years, and he also turned towards literary criticism, particularly on poetry. From 1991 to 2004, he was director of the Kamakura Museum of Literature, which he had helped create. He died in 2008 of prostate cancer.

References

1918 births
2008 deaths
People from Shibuya
Japanese literary critics
Akutagawa Prize winners
Deaths from cancer in Japan
Deaths from prostate cancer
20th-century Japanese poets
20th-century Japanese novelists
21st-century Japanese novelists